Dihydrosirohydrochlorin is one of several naturally occurring tetrapyrrole macrocyclic metabolic intermediates in the biosynthesis of vitamin B12 (cobalamin). Its oxidised form, sirohydrochlorin, is precursor to  sirohaem, the iron-containing prosthetic group in sulfite reductase enzymes. Further biosynthetic transformations convert sirohydrochlorin to cofactor F430 for an enzyme which catalyzes the release of methane in the final step of methanogenesis.

Biosynthesis
Dihydrosirohydrochlorin is derived from a tetrapyrrolic structural framework created by the enzymes deaminase and cosynthetase which transform aminolevulinic acid via porphobilinogen and hydroxymethylbilane to uroporphyrinogen III. The latter is the first macrocyclic intermediate common to haem, chlorophyll, sirohaem and vitamin B12. Uroporphyrinogen III is subsequently transformed by the addition of two methyl groups to form dihydrosirohydrochlorin.

See also
Cobalamin biosynthesis
Sirohydrochlorin
Precorrin-2 dehydrogenase

References

Tetrapyrroles